WRTH (103.3 MHz) and WLTE (95.9 MHz) are classic hits radio stations licensed to Greer, South Carolina and Pendleton, South Carolina respectively. Both stations broadcast as "103.3/95.9 Earth FM WRTH" and are located in the Greenville/Spartanburg, South Carolina area. The stations play hits from ranging from the 1970s through the 2010s.

History
103.3 signed on in January 1993 as WLYZ, simulcasting WLWZ (103.9 FM)'s urban contemporary format to the Spartanburg part of the market as "Double Z".  For history of the urban contemporary format on 103.9 prior to the sign-on of 103.3, see WSHP-FM.

In late 1994, the station's then-owner, Emerald City Broadcasting, purchased WWMM (107.3 FM) and moved the urban format to the new station since it had a much stronger signal than the 103.3/103.9 simulcast. WWMM was relaunched as WJMZ "107.3 Jamz", while the 103 simulcast became alternative rock "103-X" with 103.3 picking up the WXWZ call sign and 103.9 picking up the WXWX call sign in early 1995. 103-X was the first alternative rock station in the market, but the same signal problems that the station(s) had remained.

On January 1, 1996, 103-X added Howard Stern's radio show for mornings, but was faced with a backlash from both radio listeners and advertisers that lasted for weeks. During that time Emerald City decided to sell out to Entercom, so 103-X changed formats to oldies in February 1996; a few months later, 103.9 became WOLI and 103.3 became WOLT. The station(s) were on satellite for the next few years and in late 1999, a local airstaff was finally added.

In November 2000 the station jumped on the 1980s oldies bandwagon that was going on at the time, becoming "Star 103", but retained the call letters for both stations. The syndicated Bob and Sheri radio show was added as well as a new airstaff. Over time, the station slowly evolved toward Classic Hits, but kept the Star 103 handle. In late 2003, WOLT and WOLI changed its format to a Contemporary Christian/country hybrid as "The Walk."

In 2005, Entercom sold WOLT, WOLI, and WSPA (910 AM, now WOLI) to Davidson Media Group (a company that specializes in Latino formats; however, some other formats were carried), while retaining "The Walk" and placing it on its newly acquired 106.3 (WGVC) signal.  Davidson Media Group time-brokered the entire station out, with Mon-Sat 5:00AM–10:00AM and Sunday mornings going to Spartanburg legend Bill Drake, and the rest of the airtime going to a company that carried an urban contemporary gospel format, branding the station as "Praize 103.3" (this started in October 2005).

In 2006, following differences between Davidson Media Group and the company managing "Praize 103.3", the urban contemporary gospel format was abruptly dropped on August 10, 2006.  The following morning, after Bill Drake's program, WOLT debuted an oldies format, programmed by Davidson.  The station was known, when not airing brokered programming, as "103.3 WOLT - The Best of the 60s and 70s."  WOLT subsequently brokered a large part of its airtime out to various other music/local affairs programming, and also became the flagship station for Furman football, basketball, baseball, and coaches shows until 2013. Classic hits was the underlying 'format' of the station outside of brokered time, as an attempt to give the station an identity that tied in with all of the other classic based programs during brokered times.

In January 2012, WOLT began running CHR mix programming in certain dayparts, using syndicated programming from Chicago-based company Jamtraxx, billing their dayparted hours as "103-3 SPIN FM."  During all other hours, they broadcast and identify simply as "103-3 WOLT."

Earth FM

On March 1, 2013, the Earth FM oldies format on 910 WOLI and later an accompanying translator on 105.7, which had been launched by Davidson Media in 2012, moved to 103.3, and all brokered programming was removed.  The station continued to focus on oldies and classic hits from the mid-1960s through early 1980s. 

In February 2014, Davidson Media Group sold WOLT to Earth Radio Broadcasting LLC. The purchase was consummated on February 24, 2014 at a price of $1 million. On March 12, 2014, Salem Communications, through licensee Caron Broadcasting, Inc., purchased WOLT from Earth Radio Broadcasting. The purchase was consummated on May 6, 2014 at a price of $1.125 million. On April 24, 2014, WOLT changed its call letters to WRTH. On March 15, 2015, WRTH began simulcasting on WLTE 95.9 FM Pendleton, South Carolina.  

Throughout 2015 and 2016, the station's playlist was adjusted, removing most 1960s titles, emphasizing on 1980s music with music from the 1970s reduced and 1990s added. In 2022, the playlist was adjusted further, with the station focusing on rock from the 80s, 90s, and early 00s with some newer music being played. The station occasionally plays a song from the late 1970s.

References

External links
WRTH official website

RTH (FM)
Radio stations established in 1993
Classic hits radio stations in the United States
1993 establishments in South Carolina
Salem Media Group properties